HSV-2 may refer to:

 Herpes simplex virus 2, a human pathogen
 HSV-2 Swift, a non-commissioned catamaran leased by the United States Navy